The Gay Lord Quex is a lost 1919 American silent comedy film directed by Harry Beaumont and starring Tom Moore, Gloria Hope, and Naomi Childers It is based on the 1899 play The Gay Lord Quex by the British writer Arthur Wing Pinero.

Cast
 Tom Moore as The Marquis of Quex 
 Gloria Hope as Muriel Eden 
 Naomi Childers as The Duchess of Strood 
 Hazel Daly as Sophie Fullgarney 
 Sidney Ainsworth as Sir Chichester Frayne 
 Philo McCullough as Captain Bastling 
 Arthur Housman as Valma 
 Kate Lester as Lady Owbridge 
 Rube Miller as Jack Eden 
 Kathleen Kirkham as Mrs. Jack Eden

References

Bibliography
 Goble, Alan. The Complete Index to Literary Sources in Film. Walter de Gruyter, 1999.

External links

1919 films
1919 comedy films
Silent American comedy films
Lost American films
Films directed by Harry Beaumont
American silent feature films
1910s English-language films
Goldwyn Pictures films
Films set in London
American films based on plays
American black-and-white films
1919 lost films
Lost comedy films
1910s American films